John Baily (also Baylie)  (d. 1495) was a Canon of Windsor from 1488–1495.

Career

He is described as Inceptor Decretorum.

He was appointed:
 Prebendary of Twyford in St Paul's 1488–1495

He was appointed to the twelfth stall in St George's Chapel, Windsor Castle in 1488, and held the stall until 1495.

Notes 

1495 deaths
Canons of Windsor
Year of birth missing